Jaysh al-Sham ("Army of the Levant") was a rebel group that was active during the Syrian Civil War. The group began when the Suqour al-Sham brigade called Suyouf al-Haq split from its parent organization because it did not want to participate in the fighting between Suqour al-Sham and the Islamic State in Iraq and the Levant (ISIS).

In July 2014, the Liwa Dawud unit defected from Jaysh al-Sham to ISIS,  bringing with them 1000 men and 10 tanks. Jaysh al-Sham claimed that it had expelled them. The group was disbanded on 28 July 2014, giving the remaining affiliated groups the option to join other groups.

Groups involved
 Liwaa Suyouf al-Haq (former Suqour al-Sham brigade)
 Liwaa Ansar Allah
 Liwaa Suqour Asharq
 Liwaa fuqra'a ela Allah
 Liwaa Feteat al-Islam
 Liwaa Asuod al-Ghab
 Liwaa Nusor al-Islam
 Jisr al-Shughur Revolutionary Military Council

Defected groups
 Liwaa Dawod (defected and joined the Islamic State of Iraq and the Levant)

See also
List of armed groups in the Syrian Civil War

References

Anti-government factions of the Syrian civil war